Tswanaland was a bantustan in South West Africa (present-day Namibia), in the far central eastern area of the territory around the village of Aminuis. It was intended by the apartheid government to be a self-governing homeland for the Tswana people. Unlike all other homelands, it was never implemented that way. The Ovaherero were allowed to stay in the area, and the Tswana remained a minority. Tswanaland nevertheless got an ethnic Tswana, Constance Kgosiemang, as political leader between 1980 and 1989.

Tswanaland and all other homelands in South West Africa were abolished in May 1989 at the start of the transition to independence.

See also
Apartheid
Leaders of Tswanaland
Bophuthatswana

References

History of Namibia
Bantustans in South West Africa
States and territories established in 1980
States and territories disestablished in 1989
Tswana people